Livin' Joy are an Italian Eurodance group who released various successful hits during the mid-1990s, including "Dreamer", "Don't Stop Movin'" and "Follow the Rules". The group consists of singer Tameko Star,  and Italian brothers Paolo and Gianni Visnadi (also members of Alex Party). Janice Robinson was previously a member.

History

Janice Robinson

"Dreamer"

Dreamer was originally released by Undiscovered Recordings in 1994. Livin' Joy were fronted by American singers Janice Robinson and Tameko Star. 

During Robinson’s time in the group, they reached number 1 on the U.S. Hot Dance Club Play chart with "Dreamer". The song turned out to be a mild sleeper hit on pop radio, finally entering the Billboard Hot 100 in early 1995. It peaked at number 72 and spent seventeen weeks on the chart. The song had a more successful run in the United Kingdom, hitting the number 1 spot after being re-issued. In its original run in late 1994, "Dreamer" peaked at number 18, spending 6 straight weeks in the UK top 100. It did re-enter the lower ends of the top 100 two more times that year bringing its total to 12 weeks inside the top 100.

Tameko Star

"Don't Stop Movin'"
By 1996, Robinson had left - thus marking a new era for the group. She was replaced by American vocalist Tameko Star, who was also the songwriter and choreographer. With Star on lead vocals, the follow-up single "Don't Stop Movin'" peaked at number 5 in the UK and went on to become a big summer hit. It spent 14 consecutive weeks in the top 100, with 7 of those in the top 10.

"Don't Stop Movin'" topped the Italian charts in 1996 and also peaked at number three on the US dance chart in early 1997 and became another modest, although long-lived, hit in the mainstream - climbing to number 67 on the Hot 100, spending twenty weeks on the chart. In Australia, "Don't Stop Movin'" peaked at number 6 on the national ARIA singles chart.

Livin' Joy Album and other singles

"Don't Stop Movin'" was followed by another top 10 hit single in the UK, "Follow the Rules" which peaked at number 9 on 27 October 1996, scoring Livin' Joy a hat-trick of top 10s at this point. "Where Can I Find Love" was Livin' Joy's fourth single. Released in 1997 in the United Kingdom, it peaked at number 12 on the UK charts.

Livin' Joy's fifth and final charting single in the UK was "Deep in You". The track took on a completely different sound which had a more R&B feel. Although moderately successful, peaking at number 17 in the UK, it slowly descended out of the top 100 just four weeks after its release.

Don't Stop Movin''', was the parent album and grouped together the hits, including "Dreamer" with new vocals by Starr (although the original version with Robinson was a hidden bonus track). The album was released in the UK on 16 November 1996 (a week after the release of their third single "Follow the Rules"). The album peaked at number 41 on the UK Albums Chart, and remained on the chart for only two weeks.

Plans for a widespread commercial release of a single entitled "Just for the Sex of It" in 1999 were scrapped, due to a label merger between MCA and PolyGram who became Universal. With an entire new staff, there was a lack of interest in the second album. It only received a limited club run, but was released as a single in Australia where it peaked at number 76.

Janice Robinson subsequently re-released 2005 remixes of "Dreamer", credited as a solo release, which charted at number 5 on the U.S. dance chart.

In 2018, Robinson performed "Dreamer" on the British music competition show The X Factor''. As a contestant on the show, she finished in 14th place.

In 2022, Robinson released a new version of "Dreamer" with DJ Lodato.

In 2022, Tameko announced she is working on brand new music, including a new version of "Don't Stop Movin'". In November 2022, she released single "Something Beautiful".

Discography

Studio albums

Singles

See also
 List of Billboard number-one dance club songs
 List of artists who reached number one on the U.S. Dance Club Songs chart
 List of artists who reached number one on the UK Singles Chart

References

External links
 

Italian house music groups
Italian Eurodance groups